Dr Steven Kennedy  is an Australian public servant. He was appointed secretary of the Department of the Treasury in September 2019. He previously served as secretary of the Department of Infrastructure, Transport, Cities and Regional Development from September 2017 to August 2019.  Kennedy helped convince the Morrison government to implement JobKeeper during the COVID-19 pandemic.

References

Living people
Year of birth missing (living people)

Secretaries of Australian Government departments

Australian National University alumni

University of Sydney alumni
Australian nurses
Secretaries of the Department of the Treasury of Australia